Katangi Dam, is an earthfill dam on Katanginalla river near Goregaon, Gondia district in state of Maharashtra in India.

Specifications

Purpose
 Irrigation
 Fishing 
 Drinking water

See also
 Dams in Maharashtra
 List of reservoirs and dams in India

References

Dams in Gondia district
Year of establishment missing